Körmendi Football Club is a professional football club based in Körmend, Vas County, Hungary, that competes in the Vas county league.

Name changes
?-?: Körmendi Testedző Kör
?-1945: Körmendi LE
1945–1949: Körmendi Testedző Kör
1949–1950: Körmendi Építők
1950–1951: Körmendi Ládagyári SE
1951–1952: Körmendi Ládagyári Építők
1952–1970: Körmendi Építők
1970: merger with Körmendi Felsőfokú Mezőgazdasági Technikum
1970–1973: Körmendi Medosz Technikus Egyetértés
1973–1976: Körmendi Főiskola MEDOSZ Technikus Egyetértés
1976–?: Körmendi Dózsa FMTE
?-?: Körmendi Dózsa Munkás Testedző Egyesület
?-1994:Körmendi Football Club
1994–?: Körmend Pumtex-Babati Hús FC
?-?: Körmendi Football Club
2009–2010: Körmendi Football Club-Boldizsár Trans
2010–present: Körmendi Football Club

External links
 Profile on Magyar Futball

References

Football clubs in Hungary
Association football clubs established in 1911
1911 establishments in Hungary